Oliver Mwimba (born 6 November 1994) is an Olympic athlete from the Democratic Republic of Congo.

Career
Mwimba qualified from his preliminary heat at the Athletics at the 2020 Summer Olympics – Men's 100 metres race, in a time of 10.63 seconds.

Personal life
Born in the Democratic Republic of the Congo, Mwimba moved to South Africa at a young age and studied accounting at the Tshwane University of Technology in Pretoria.

References

External links
 

1994 births
Living people
Democratic Republic of the Congo male sprinters
Olympic athletes of the Democratic Republic of the Congo
Athletes (track and field) at the 2020 Summer Olympics
Democratic Republic of the Congo emigrants to South Africa
Tshwane University of Technology alumni